Robert de Scales (c. 1395–1418) died unmarried, and at an early age, and was succeeded by his brother Thomas. On 8 May 1410 an order to seize Robert and deliver him to the Treasurer of England was issued.

References

1418 deaths
Year of birth uncertain
Place of birth unknown
Barons Scales